Andrew William Lindsay Hedge CStJ (born in Papatoetoe, 1972) is the current Anglican Bishop of Waiapu in New Zealand.

Hedge was ordained  in 1998. After a curacy at All Saint's Howick, he was Chaplain at  Kings School, Auckland; and Vicar of Cambridge, New Zealand from 2008 until his appointment to the episcopate. He was consecrated a bishop on 18 October 2014.

References

1973 births
Living people
Anglican bishops of Waiapu
21st-century Anglican bishops in New Zealand
Religious leaders from Auckland